Fundamentals of Marxism–Leninism is a book by a group of Soviet authors headed by Otto Wille Kuusinen. The work is considered one of the fundamental works on dialectical materialism and on  Leninist communism. The book remains important in understanding the philosophy and politics of the Soviet Union; it consolidates the work of important contributions to Marxist theory.

Publication 

The first edition of The Fundamentals was published in 1960. A second revised edition was published in 1963. The text draws heavily on the works of Karl Marx and Vladimir Lenin, with additional references to Friedrich Engels and Nikita Khrushchev.

Synopsis

Part One: The Philosophical Foundations of The Marxist-Leninist World Outlook

Part One of Fundamentals covers materialist and idealist philosophy, the use of dialectics within materialist philosophy and its opposition to metaphysics, and develops a theory of knowledge, truth, necessity, and human freedom.

The text argues that only a consistently materialist approach to philosophy can be truly scientific, since it requires the recognition of the objective existence of matter, as outside and independent of the human mind.

Part Two: The Materialist Conception of History

Part Two of the work covers Marxist theories of history, or historical materialism, by outlining the role of the mode of production, class, class struggles, the state and the individual in social development.

Part Three: Political Economy of Capitalism

Part Three summarizes Marx's Das Kapital and Lenin's theory of Imperialism.

Part Four: Theory and Tactics of the International Communist Movement
Part Four covers the Marxist–Leninist strategy of the international communist and working-class movement.

Part Five: Socialism and Communism
Part Five summarizes the main features of the socialist mode of production.

See also
Ideology of the Communist Party of the Soviet Union

External links 
 Fundamentals of Marxism-Leninism, second revised edition in PDF format
 Fundamentals of Marxism-Leninism, original 1960 edition in PDF format

Marxist books